This is a complete list of those who were made Knights/Dames Grand Companion of the New Zealand Order of Merit from the date of the Order's establishment in 1996 by Queen Elizabeth II, on 30 May 1996. Knights/Dames Grand Cross use the post-nominal GNZM. From 2000 to 2009, the highest level of the Order were Principal Companion (PCNZM) without the appellation of "Sir" or "Dame".

Dame Silvia Cartwright who was a Dame in 1989 and Sir Ivor Richardson who was Knighted in 1986 chose not to convert their respective PCNZM to GNZM.

Knights/Dames Grand Companion

Principal Companions

Additional members

References

Knights Grand Companion of the New Zealand Order of Merit
Principal Companions of the New Zealand Order of Merit